Huffaker may refer to:

People
Clair Huffaker (1926–1990), American author of Western fiction
Carl B. Huffaker (1914–1995), American biologist and agricultural scientist
Scott Huffaker (born 1999), American racing driver

Places
 Huffaker, a district in Rome, Georgia
Huffaker, Illinois, a populated place in Sangamon County
Huffaker, Nevada, a former settlement in Washoe County
Huffaker, Utah, a populated place in Salt Lake County